Babrala is a town and nagar panchayat in Sambhal district in the state of Uttar Pradesh, India. Babrala is located on NH 509 (Moradabad to Aligarh). Babrala is located near Narora Atomic Power Station. The prestigious Yara Fertilizers Private Limited (Formerly known as Tata Chemicals Limited) Plant is also located in Babrala with an installed capacity of 864,600 tonnes of urea per year. There is a prominent DAV Fertilizer Public School in Indira Dham, Yara Fertilizer, Babrala. Total Area 6.18 sq km. There is Raj Ghat of Ganga River in Babrala. Maa Ganga Jan Sewa Samiti, Babrala is organising daily Ganga Aarti at Rajghat, Babrala.

Geography 
It has an average elevation of 177 metres (580 feet).

Demographics
As of the 2018 India , Babrala had a population of 14,447. Males constitute 53% of the population and females 47%. Babrala has an average literacy rate of 72%, more than the national average of 59.5%; with 80% of the males and 76% of females literate. 17% of the population is under 6 years of age.

References 

Cities and towns in Sambhal district